Hans Köhler (born 21 June 1936) is a German former swimmer. He competed in three events at the 1956 Summer Olympics.

References

1936 births
Living people
German male swimmers
Olympic swimmers of the United Team of Germany
Swimmers at the 1956 Summer Olympics
Sportspeople from Darmstadt
20th-century German people
21st-century German people